Shane Vincent (birth unknown) is a former rugby league footballer who played in the 1990s. He played for the Penrith Panthers in 1993, the Newcastle Knights in 1994, London Broncos, the South Sydney Rabbitohs in 1996, and finally the North Queensland Cowboys in 1997.

References

External links
http://www.rugbyleagueproject.org/players/Shane_Vincent/summary.html

1973 births
Living people
Australian rugby league players
Penrith Panthers players
South Sydney Rabbitohs players
North Queensland Cowboys players
Newcastle Knights players
Place of birth missing (living people)
London Broncos players
Rugby league centres
Rugby league wingers